Trichomycterus iheringi is a species of pencil catfish endemic to Brazil in São Paulo and Paraná states, centred on Santos where it is found in the Ribeira do Iguape River basin.

This is an elongate catfish up to  standard length. It has no unique morphological features and can be distinguished from its congeners by a combination of characters including a uniformly buff colouring with small dark spots over the whole body, pelvic fin margin distant from the urogenital opening and rounded caudal fin.

References
 
 

iheringi
Fish of South America
Fish of Brazil
Taxa named by Carl H. Eigenmann
Fish described in 1917
Endemic fauna of Brazil